The broad-toothed tailless bat (Anoura latidens) is a species of bats in the family Phyllostomidae. It is found in Colombia, Peru, and Venezuela.

References

Anoura
Mammals of Colombia
Mammals of Peru
Mammals of Venezuela
Mammals described in 1984
Taxonomy articles created by Polbot
Bats of South America